Athisayan is a 2007 Indian Malayalam-language science fiction monster film written and directed by Vinayan, starring Master Devadas with Jackie Shroff (in his Malayalam debut), Kavya Madhavan, Karthika, Jayasurya and Mukesh in other roles.  The film is inspired from the 2003 film Hulk. The film was later dubbed and released in Hindi as Naya Ajooba in 2009.

Plot
Maya, a young television reporter, works for New India Television. Radharamanan, the managing director of the channel, has a fascination for Maya, who was brought up in an orphanage by Father Chanthakkadan.  Maya takes up the responsibility of bringing up a few orphans whom she has picked up from the streets. One of these kids is Devan, who is sort of a child prodigy, with a computer-like mind and very good in studies and extra-curricular activities. R. C. Shekhar, a scientist, lives very near their house, with his servant Damodaran. He is working on a project, which could help in making human beings invisible. On the very day that he successfully experiments his 'magic' potion on a rabbit, he is urgently called to the U.S as his daughter, who is studying there, meets with an accident. Devan watches the experiment.

Meanwhile, Maya's friend and lover Roy, also a journalist, is in jail after having been framed in a murder case by some influential politicians, including the State Revenue Minister Divakaran, another minister Yunus Kunju, the Police Commissioner Shanmughan and the very influential Kuwait Nazar. With the help of the newly appointed Collector Anita Williams, Maya shoots a video of these baddies accepting millions of rupees as commission from some Arab businessmen, who are there to sign some business deals with the State Government.

Maya immediately goes to Radharamanan and shows him the clip. Radharamanan is thrilled and agrees to telecast it, after discussing it with the board of directors. Somehow Nazar, Divakaran and others come to know of this, and they go after Maya, to get from her the memory card containing the clipping. On the very same day that R. C. Shekhar goes to the U.S, Maya is abducted by Nazar and group. The kids are baffled. Anita Williams, Father Chanthakkadan and Radharamanan know who are behind this, but nothing can be done without sufficient evidence. And then Devan steals into Shekhar's lab and drinks the potion. He becomes invisible and sets out to save Maya.

He successfully saves Maya but he loses the memory card. Radharamanan and Maya releases Roy on bail with Devan's help. Angrily Nazar kidnaps Roy and kills him with Yunus's help. Meanwhile, Shekhar comes back from U.S. and plans to make Devan visible. Devan then retrieves the memory card which was in his pockets and hands it over to Radharamanan. But Nazar's henchmen Johnny and his other men tries to take it from Radharamanan but he refuses to give it. A fight occurs between, Radharamanan and Nazar's henchmen. Shekhar sees this and saves Radharamanan from them. Nazar and Yunus arrives there and tries to take the memory card but it fails. Radharamanan goes to telecast the clip. When Yunus tries to shoot him, Devan comes in between and gets shot. Due to the potion, he gets saved, but as a side effect of getting shot (which Shekhar warns no metallic objects should make a scratch on him), he turns into a gigantic monster and kills those who have done wrong to him and his family. Shekhar couldn't save him. After killing the baddies, Devan leaves Maya and the children and makes his abode in the deep ocean, with an end note saying that "to fight for the Justice, Devan will come back as Athisayan".

Cast

Master Devadas as Devan
Jackie Shroff as R. C. Shekhar
Jayasurya as Roy
Mukesh as Radharamanan
Kavya Madhavan as Maya
Karthika as Anitha Williams
Jagadish as Koshi
Thilakan as Father Chanthakkadan
Baby Nayanthara as Kingini
Harisree Ashokan as Damodaran
Guinness Pakru as Ramu
Indrans as Swami
Devan as Kuwait Nazar
Ramu as Yunus Kunju
Baburaj as Parunthu Johnny
Tini Tom as Jamal
Rajan P. Dev as Minister Divakaran
Bheeman Raghu as Shanmughan
Mala Aravindan as Justice Rama Moorthy
Augustine as Public Prosecutor 
Sadiq as Police officer
Mafia Sasi as Goonda
Chali Pala as Police Officer
Gagandeep Virk as Police Officer
N. L. Balakrishnan as Manthravadi
Lakshmi Priya as Shahidha, Kingini's mother
Usha as Susie, Koshi's wife
Ponnamma Babu

Production
Devadas was cast in the film because the film's producer was his father's friend. This was the first film he shot for although Anandabhairavi was released first. The shooting of the film was in Kerala, mainly in locations in Aluva and Ernakulam. The film was high on special effects, visual effects and 2D Animation. These special effects of Athisayan were done at EFX, Chennai. Jackie Shroff plays a scientist in this film, which marks his Malayalam debut.

Soundtrack

The music of Athisayan is by Alphonse Joseph. The lyrics are written by Vinayan and Vayalar Sarath Chandra Varma. The film has four songs. The singers are Vineeth Sreenivasan, Rimi Tomy, Vidhu Prathap, Balu, Karthik and Sithara. Sithara was debuted through this film.

Release and reception
Athisayan was released in Kerala during the summer vacation, on 17 April 2007, mainly aiming at children.

A critic from Sify wrote that the film "defies all logic and is a hotch potch of various films. At best it provides some fun for the kids, however the graphic work in the film is tacky, making it difficult to watch the long drawn out climax scenes [...] A battalion of comedians and kids provide some relief. Master Devadas's ability to play his characters wit and melancholy keeps the film going". Unni Nair of Nowrunning.com wrote that "Athishayan is as an average film, but for kids who'd be looking for something entertaining this summer, Athishayan would be fine. It's a film that you would very likely enjoy if you cast yourself in the mindset of a kid".

The Hindi dubbed version of the film, titled Naya Ajooba, was released in 2009.

See also
 Science fiction film of India

References

External links
 

2000s Malayalam-language films
2000s Indian superhero films
2000s children's fantasy films
2007 science fiction films
Indian science fiction films
Indian superhero films
Indian children's films
Films shot in Kochi
2000s monster movies
Films about invisibility
Films directed by Vinayan